Joe Behan (born 30 July 1959) is an Irish politician. He served as a Teachta Dála (TD) for the Wicklow constituency from 2007 to 2011. He was elected as a TD at the 2007 general election.

A former teacher and primary school principal from Bray, Behan was a long-serving member of Bray Town Council and Wicklow County Council, winning and holding his seat at the 1999 and 2004 local elections. He was Cathaoirleach (chairman) of Wicklow County Council from 2006 to 2007, but in accordance with the abolition of the dual mandate under the Local Government Act 2001 he was deemed to have resigned his council seats when elected to the Dáil in 2007.

Behan unsuccessfully sought the Fianna Fáil nomination to contest the 1997 general election in the Wicklow constituency. He did not win a nomination until December 2006, when he was one of three candidates selected by the party for the 2007 general election. He was elected to Dáil Éireann at the 2007 general election.

On 17 October 2008 he resigned from Fianna Fáil in protest at the 2009 Budget. In his letter of resignation he stated: "I intend to adopt an independent stance on each and every issue which comes before the Dáil from now on." He stood for re-election in Wicklow at the 2011 general election as an Independent, but lost his seat receiving 6% of the first preference vote, down from 14.5% in 2007.

In 2014, he announced that he would be standing as an Independent for the 2014 local elections for the Bray local electoral area. He was elected to Wicklow County Council on the first count, gaining 1776 (just over 14%) first preference votes, 384 more than the quota.

He was an independent candidate for the Wicklow constituency at the 2016 general election but was not elected. He was re-elected to Wicklow County Council in the 2019 local elections on the first count, having topped the poll in Bray East with 1880 (just under 29%) first preference votes.

Behan stood as an independent in Wicklow for the 2020 general election. He received 2,988 first preference votes (4.2%) and was eliminated on the 13th count.

References

External links
 

 

1959 births
Living people
Fianna Fáil TDs
Independent TDs
Local councillors in County Wicklow
Members of the 30th Dáil
People from Bray, County Wicklow
Politicians from County Wicklow